Corteolona e Genzone is a comune (municipality) in the Province of Pavia in the Italian region Lombardy.

It was established on 1 January 2016 by the merger of the municipalities of Corteolona and Genzone.

References

Cities and towns in Lombardy